Tom Vermeer (born 28 December 1985) is a Dutch cyclist, who currently rides for Belgian amateur team Acrog–Tormans.

Major results

2011
 8th Grand Prix Impanis-Van Petegem
2012
 6th Overall Five Rings of Moscow
 7th Overall Tour of China II
2013
 1st Ronde van Overijssel
 1st  Mountains classification Czech Cycling Tour
 1st Stage 4 Tour du Loir-et-Cher
 3rd Beverbeek Classic
 4th De Kustpijl
 5th Overall Kreiz Breizh Elites
2014
 8th Grand Prix des Marbriers
 9th Omloop der Kempen
 10th Overall Kreiz Breizh Elites
2017
 6th Kernen Omloop Echt-Susteren
 7th De Kustpijl
 10th Omloop Mandel-Leie-Schelde

References

External links

1985 births
Living people
Dutch male cyclists
Sportspeople from Maastricht
20th-century Dutch people
21st-century Dutch people
Cyclists from Limburg (Netherlands)